Dumb Blood is the debut studio album by indie rock band Vant. The album, produced by Sam Miller, was released on 17 February 2017 by Parlophone. A deluxe edition of the album was simultaneously released featuring tracks from the band's "Karma Seeker" EP, B-sides and previously un-released songs.

Background 
Vant formed in London in 2014. The band met in a Death Metal Club in London where they had moved to pursue music. The band took heavy influence from global issues such as "equality, education and the environment". Front man Mattie aimed to make music with messages behind them feeling that it was lost in Rock music and something only found in Hip-Hop. He cites The Clash, Neil Young, Nina Simone, M.I.A. and Bob Dylan as artists who inspired him cause they stood for what they believed in. The band self-released their debut single, the double A side, "Parasite/Do You Know Me?" on 22 April 2015. Shortly after its release the band signed to Parlophone Records and received extensive airplay from BBC Radio 1, XFM and Amazing Radio. Zane Lowe made the band his "Next Hype" and played "Parasite" 3 times in one show. Their following singles "The Answer", "Parking Lot", "Fly-By Alien", "Karma Seeker" and "Peace & Love" were all debuted on BBC Radio 1 as Annie Mac's 'Hottest Record in the World'. "Dumb Blood" was announced on Annie Mac's show after the premiere of "Peace & Love" on 11 October 2016.

Critical reception 

Dumb Blood received mixed reviews from music critics. At Metacritic, which assigns a normalized rating out of 100 to reviews from mainstream critics, the album received an average score of 69, based on 6 reviews.

Track listing

Personnel 
Adapted from the album's liner notes.

Vant
 Mattie Vant – lead vocals, guitar, bass guitar, keyboards
 Henry Eastman – guitar, backing vocals, bass guitar
 Billy Morris – bass guitar
 David 'Greenie' Green – drums and percussion.

Additional musicians 
 Sam Miller – Percussion on "The Answer", "Peace & Love", "Do You Know Me?", "Headed for the Sun", "Karma Seeker", "Time & Money", "Mess Around", "Birth Certificate", "All Our Babies" and "Holy Water", keyboards on "Put Down Your Gun" and synthesizers on "Peace & Love", "Karma Seeker", "Time & Money", "Birth Certificate".
 Martin Söderin – drums on "The Answer", "Parking Lot", "I Don't Believe in God" and "Mess Around"
 Henry Bennett – drums on "Do You Know Me?", "Headed for the Sun", "Parasite" and "Birth Certificate".

Production 
 Sam Miller – production and mixing
 Martin Brammer – co-producer on "Do You Know Me?" and "Parasite"
 Rich Costey – mixing on "The Answer"
 Howie Weinberg – mastering
 Gentry Studer – mastering
 LANDR – mastering on "Parking Lot"
 John Davis – mastering on "Do You Know Me?" and "Parasite"

Design 
 Mattie Vant – art direction, design
 Richard Welland – art direction, design
 Steve Gullick – photography

Charts

References 

2017 debut albums
Vant (band) albums
Parlophone albums